Easy Money III: Life Deluxe is a 2013 Swedish thriller film directed by Jens Jonsson, based on the novel Livet Deluxe by Jens Lapidus. The film is the third installment in the Easy Money film series, following Easy Money and Easy Money II: Hard to Kill. Matias Varela and Joel Kinnaman reprise their roles as career criminal Jorge and business student turned convict JW, respectively, alongside returning cast members Dejan Čukić and Madeleine Martin and series newcomers Martin Wallström and Malin Buska. Set after the events of the second film, Easy Money III: Life Deluxe continues the stories of Jorge, JW, and the Serbian mob as their paths intertwine through their criminal activities.

Plot 
Now living in the United States, JW continues his search to uncover the fate of his missing sister Camilla. Through his personal investigation, he eventually learns that she became involved with Serbian mob boss Radovan as an exotic dancer and mistress. When Radovan found out that Camilla was planning to leave, he had his second-in-command Stefanovic kill her to set an example to the other dancers.

Back in Sweden, Radovan survives an assassination attempt. To protect his daughter and only surviving child Natalie, he assigns subordinate Martin to watch over her. Unknown to Radovan, however, Martin is an undercover officer tasked with infiltrating his mob to bring him to justice. Martin has been able to infiltrate the mob with information provided by the incarcerated Jorge, who is released early for his cooperation and sent to work at a nursing home. Jorge learns that Nadja, the former sex slave he became close with, is also working at the nursing home and the two enter into a relationship. While Nadja intends to stay out of criminal activities, however, Jorge is secretly planning a large robbery for Swedish mob boss Finnen that he believes will allow him to retire.

The robbery is successful, but Jorge and his men are double-crossed by Finnen. Only Jorge survives and manages to retrieve a bag of money, which he uses to escape to Mexico. He contacts Nadja, who reveals that she is pregnant. Martin and Natalie become romantically involved while Radovan realizes that Martin is a police officer. Before he acts on this information, however, Radovan is killed by a car bomb. Natalie is led to believe that the assassination was orchestrated by Stefanovic and attempts to kill him. Although her attempt fails, Martin saves her and kills Stefanovic, leaving Natalie as the mob's leader.

When Jorge calls Nadja again, he learns that she has been kidnapped by Finnen and will only be released in exchange for the remaining money. He contacts Martin for assistance in saving Nadja and the two meet with Finnen and his men for the exchange. Martin manages to rescue Nadja, while Jorge engages in a gunfight with Finnen and is seemingly killed in an explosion. Natalie uncovers Martin's status as an undercover officer and confronts him with this information when he returns, but gives him the opportunity to escape. She then learns that her father's assassination was orchestrated by JW in retaliation for Camilla's murder. With this knowledge, Natalie tracks down JW and personally executes him.

Two weeks after Jorge's apparent death, Nadja learns that he is still alive, having faked his death after killing Finnen and his men and retrieving the money. In a letter, Jorge explains that he was waiting for the right time to tell her the truth and extends an offer for her to live with him at his new home in Mexico. Nadja accepts and reunites with Jorge.

Cast 
 Matias Varela as Jorge
 Joel Kinnaman as JW
 Martin Wallström as Martin Hägerström 
 Malin Buska as Natalie Krajnic
 Dejan Čukić as Radovan
 Madeleine Martin as Nadja
 Cedomir Djordjevic as Stefanovic
 Saša Petrović as Dragan
 Mats Andersson as Finnen
 Pablo Leiva Wenger as Pablo
 Hugo Ruiz as Sergio
 Maja Christenson Kin as Camilla Westlund
 Hamdija Causevic as Goran
 Claudio Oyarzo as Ramon
 Victor Gadderus as Ivan Hasdic
 Gerhard Hoberstorfer as Torsfjäll
 Kalled Mustonen as David
 Aliette Opheim as Lollo
 Ida Idili Jonsson as Anna/Candy
 Iwar Wiklander as Police colleague

References

External links 
 
 

2013 films
2010s Swedish-language films
Films directed by Jens Jonsson
Films set in Stockholm
Swedish thriller drama films
Films scored by Jon Ekstrand
Films based on Swedish novels
Tre Vänner films
2013 thriller drama films
Films about organized crime in Sweden
Films about the Serbian Mafia
2013 drama films
2010s Swedish films